The following is a list of the top National Football League (NFL) head coaches in wins.

Don Shula holds the current records for regular season wins at 328 and combined regular and postseason wins at 347. Bill Belichick holds the record for postseason wins at 31 and is the active leader in regular season and combined wins at 298 and 329, respectively.

List 

This sortable table shows the top 100 NFL head coaches in order of total regular season wins. The table also shows every team for which he was a head coach and his record with each team.

When sorting teams, coaches are listed in order of wins for that team.

Teams grouped together :

Notes
  The NFL did not officially count ties in the standings until .  Therefore, ties occurring prior to 1972 do not count toward a coach's win percentage, while ties occurring 1972 or later count as half-win, half-loss.
  Does not include Paul Brown's four-year AAFC record of 47–4–3.
  In 2012, Bruce Arians served as acting head coach of the Indianapolis Colts for 12 games as head coach Chuck Pagano was on medical leave. The Colts' 9–3 record in these games is credited to Pagano and is reflected in the totals on this chart.
  Does not include Ray Flaherty's four-year AAFC record of 26–16–2.
  Does not include Buck Shaw's four-year AAFC record of 38–14–2.

Postseason wins

See also 

List of current National Football League head coaches
List of Super Bowl head coaches
NFL head coach playoff records
List of professional gridiron football coaches with 200 wins

References 

head coaches
National Football League records and achievements